The 1996 Major League Baseball season was the Cleveland Indians' third season at Jacobs Field. For the second consecutive season, the Indians had the best record in Major League Baseball. This was the first time in franchise history that the Indians had accomplished that feat. Between May 30 and August 19, the Indians hit at least one double in each of 75 games, the longest such streak in MLB since 1901.

Offseason
November 9, 1995: Rubén Amaro Jr. was released by the Cleveland Indians.
December 6, 1995: Casey Candaele was signed as a free agent with the Cleveland Indians.
December 7, 1995: Julio Franco was signed as a free agent with the Cleveland Indians.
 December 14, 1995: Jack McDowell signed as a free agent with the Cleveland Indians.
 January 4, 1996: Mario Díaz was signed as a free agent with the Cleveland Indians.
 March 31, 1996: Mark Clark was traded by the Cleveland Indians to the New York Mets for Reid Cornelius and Ryan Thompson.

Regular season

Once again, the Indians had a formidable offensive lineup. They led the Majors in hits (1,665), batting average (.293), on-base percentage (.369). They also struck out an MLB-low 844 times.

Season standings

Record vs. opponents

Game log

|- bgcolor="ffbbbb"
| 1 || April 2 || Yankees || 1–7 || Cone || Martinez (0–1) || — || 42,289 || 0–1
|- bgcolor="ffbbbb"
| 2 || April 3 || Yankees || 1–5 || Pettitte || McDowell (0–1) || Nelson || 41,843 || 0–2
|- bgcolor="ffbbbb"
| 3 || April 5 || Blue Jays || 1–7 || Guzman || Hershiser (0–1) || — || 41,782 || 0–3
|- bgcolor="ccffcc"
| 4 || April 6 || Blue Jays || 5–3 || Nagy (1–0) || Hanson || Mesa (1) || 41,852 || 1–3
|- bgcolor="ccffcc"
| 5 || April 7 || Blue Jays || 8–3 || Martinez (1–1) || Quantrill || — || 41,689 || 2–3
|- bgcolor="ffbbbb"
| 6 || April 10 || @ Orioles || 2–3 (10) || Orosco || Tavarez (0–1) || — || 45,097 || 2–4
|- bgcolor="ffbbbb"
| 7 || April 11 || @ Orioles || 4–14 || Erickson || Hershiser (0–2) || Rhodes || 43,189 || 2–5
|- bgcolor="ccffcc"
| 8 || April 12 || @ Red Sox || 3–1 || Nagy (2–0) || Sele || Mesa (2) || 26,703 || 3–5
|- bgcolor="ccffcc"
| 9 || April 13 || @ Red Sox || 14–2 || Martinez (2–1) || Moyer || — || 31,827 || 4–5
|- bgcolor="ccffcc"
| 10 || April 14 || @ Red Sox || 7–6 (11) || Tavarez (1–1) || Stanton || Mesa (3) || 31,796 || 5–5
|- bgcolor="ccffcc"
| 11 || April 15 || @ Red Sox || 8–0 || McDowell (1–1) || Wakefield || — || 32,861 || 6–5
|- bgcolor="ccffcc"
| 12 || April 16 || @ Twins || 7–2 || Hershiser (1–2) || Radke || — || 13,103 || 7–5
|- bgcolor="ffbbbb"
| 13 || April 17 || @ Twins || 8–9 || Hansell || Shuey (0–1) || Stevens || 11,276 || 7–6
|- bgcolor="ccffcc"
| 14 || April 19 || Red Sox || 9–4 || Martinez (3–1) || Gordon || — || 40,521 || 8–6
|- bgcolor="ccffcc"
| 15 || April 20 || Red Sox || 2–1 || McDowell (2–1) || Wakefield || Mesa (4) || 40,498 || 9–6
|- bgcolor="ccffcc"
| 16 || April 21 || Red Sox || 11–7 || Ogea (1–0) || Pennington || — || 42,256 || 10–6
|- bgcolor="ccffcc"
| 17 || April 22 || Orioles || 6–3 || Nagy (3–0) || Erickson || Mesa (5) || 42,236 || 11–6
|- bgcolor="ccffcc"
| 18 || April 23 || Orioles || 9–8 || Ogea (2–0) || Mussina || Mesa (6) || 40,770 || 12–6
|- bgcolor="ffbbbb"
| 19 || April 24 || @ Yankees || 8–10 || Kamieniecki || Martinez (3–2) || — || 20,187 || 12–7
|- bgcolor="ccffcc"
| 20 || April 25 || @ Yankees || 4–3 || Poole (1–0) || Pettitte || Mesa (7) || 18,580 || 13–7
|- bgcolor="ccffcc"
| 21 || April 26 || @ Blue Jays || 6–3 || Hershiser (2–2) || Hanson || Mesa (8) || 30,227 || 14–7
|- bgcolor="ffbbbb"
| 22 || April 27 || @ Blue Jays || 6–11 || Castillo || Nagy (3–1) || — || 40,140 || 14–8
|- bgcolor="ccffcc"
| 23 || April 28 || @ Blue Jays || 17–3 || Lopez (1–0) || Viola || — || 31,143 || 15–8
|- bgcolor="ccffcc"
| 24 || April 30 || White Sox || 5–3 || Martinez (4–2) || Tapani || Mesa (9) || 40,268 || 16–8
|-

|- bgcolor="ccffcc"
| 25 || May 1 || White Sox || 9–5 || McDowell (3–1) || McCaskill || Plunk (1) || 40,447 || 17–8
|- bgcolor="ccffcc"
| 26 || May 2 || @ Mariners || 6–4 || Hershiser (3–2) || Wolcott || Mesa (10) || 21,711 || 18–8
|- bgcolor="ccffcc"
| 27 || May 3 || @ Mariners || 5–2 || Nagy (4–1) || Hitchcock || Mesa (11) || 38,086 || 19–8
|- bgcolor="ffbbbb"
| 28 || May 4 || @ Mariners || 1–5 || Menhart || Lopez (1–1) || — || 57,133 || 19–9
|- bgcolor="ccffcc"
| 29 || May 5 || @ Mariners || 2–0 || Martinez (5–2) || Bosio || Mesa (12) || 56,883 || 20–9
|- bgcolor="ffbbbb"
| 30 || May 6 || @ Athletics || 3–5 || Taylor || Assenmacher (0–1) || Mohler || 47,313 || 20–10
|- bgcolor="ffbbbb"
| 31 || May 7 || @ Athletics || 4–8 || Johns || Hershiser (3–3) || — || 10,126 || 20–11
|- bgcolor="ccffcc"
| 32 || May 8 || @ Athletics || 7–3 || Nagy (5–1) || Reyes || — || 9,288 || 21–11
|- bgcolor="ffbbbb"
| 33 || May 10 || @ Angels || 8–13 || Boskie || Lopez (1–2) || — || 23,522 || 21–12
|- bgcolor="ccffcc"
| 34 || May 11 || @ Angels || 6–5 || McDowell (4–1) || Sanderson || Mesa (13) || 32,102 || 22–12
|- bgcolor="ccffcc"
| 35 || May 12 || @ Angels || 4–1 || Poole (2–0) || Percival || Mesa (14) || 22,768 || 23–12
|- bgcolor="ccffcc"
| 36 || May 14 || Tigers || 5–1 || Nagy (6–1) || Gohr || — || 40,765 || 24–12
|- bgcolor="ccffcc"
| 37 || May 15 || Tigers || 5–2 || Martinez (6–2) || Lima || Mesa (15) || 42,259 || 25–12
|- bgcolor="ccffcc"
| 38 || May 16 || Tigers || 8–3 || McDowell (5–1) || Williams || — || 42,330 || 26–12
|- bgcolor="ccffcc"
| 39 || May 17 || Rangers || 12–10 || Embree (1–0) || Heredia || Mesa (16) || 41,225 || 27–12
|- bgcolor="ffbbbb"
| 40 || May 18 || Rangers || 3–6 || Oliver || Anderson (0–1) || Henneman || 40,973 || 27–13
|- bgcolor="ccffcc"
| 41 || May 19 || Rangers || 8–5 || Nagy (7–1) || Witt || Mesa (17) || 43,299 || 28–13
|- bgcolor="ccffcc"
| 42 || May 21 || Brewers || 6–5 || Tavarez (2–1) || Boze || — || 39,974 || 29–13
|- bgcolor="ffbbbb"
| 43 || May 22 || Brewers || 8–10 || Karl || McDowell (5–2) || Fetters || 41,027 || 29–14
|- bgcolor="ccffcc"
| 44 || May 23 || Brewers || 5–1 || Hershiser (4–3) || Miranda || — || 42,395 || 30–14
|- bgcolor="ccffcc"
| 45 || May 24 || @ Tigers || 6–3 || Plunk (1–0) || Veres || Mesa (18) || 26,967 || 31–14
|- bgcolor="ccffcc"
| 46 || May 25 || @ Tigers || 7–6 || Nagy (8–1) || Lewis || Mesa (19) || 41,527 || 32–14
|- bgcolor="ccffcc"
| 47 || May 26 || @ Tigers || 5–0 || Martinez (7–2) || Williams || — || 39,056 || 33–14
|- bgcolor="ffbbbb"
| 48 || May 27 || @ Rangers || 2–3 || Pavlik || McDowell (5–3) || — || 46,521 || 33–15
|- bgcolor="ffbbbb"
| 49 || May 28 || @ Rangers || 3–11 || Oliver || Hershiser (4–4) || — || 35,727 || 33–16
|- bgcolor="ffbbbb"
| 50 || May 29 || @ Rangers || 4–5 || Cook || Tavarez (2–2) || Henneman || 35,893 || 33–17
|- bgcolor="ccffcc"
| 51 || May 30 || @ Brewers || 2–0 || Nagy (9–1) || Bones || Mesa (20) || 11,543 || 34–17
|- bgcolor="ccffcc"
| 52 || May 31 || @ Brewers || 10–4 || Martinez (8–2) || McDonald || — || 24,050 || 35–17
|-

|- bgcolor="ffbbbb"
| 53 || June 1 || @ Brewers || 1–2 || Garcia || McDowell (5–4) || Fetters || 22,004 || 35–18
|- bgcolor="ccffcc"
| 54 || June 2 || @ Brewers || 11–6 || Poole (3–0) || Karl || — || 21,150 || 36–18
|- bgcolor="ffbbbb"
| 55 || June 4 || Mariners || 7–10 || Carmona || Mesa (0–1) || Charlton || 42,179 || 36–19
|- bgcolor="ccffcc"
| 56 || June 5 || Mariners || 13–5 || Plunk (2–0) || Milacki || — || 42,274 || 37–19
|- bgcolor="ffbbbb"
| 57 || June 6 || Mariners || 2–5 || Wells || Martinez (8–3) || Charlton || 42,236 || 37–20
|- bgcolor="ccffcc"
| 58 || June 7 || Angels || 4–3 || McDowell (6–4) || Boskie || Mesa (21) || 42,260 || 38–20
|- bgcolor="ccffcc"
| 59 || June 8 || Angels || 5–0 || Hershiser (5–4) || Finley || — || 42,267 || 39–20
|- bgcolor="ffbbbb"
| 60 || June 9 || Angels || 6–8 (13) || Hancock || Tavarez (2–3) || — || 42,237 || 39–21
|- bgcolor="ccffcc"
| 61 || June 10 || Athletics || 5–4 || Nagy (10–1) || Johns || Mesa (22) || 42,167 || 40–21
|- bgcolor="ccffcc"
| 62 || June 11 || Athletics || 6–5 (13) || Ogea (3–0) || Reyes || — || 42,249 || 41–21
|- bgcolor="ffbbbb"
| 63 || June 12 || Athletics || 6–9 || Montgomery || McDowell (6–5) || Mohler || 40,673 || 41–22
|- bgcolor="ccffcc"
| 64 || June 13 || @ Yankees || 6–2 || Hershiser (6–4) || Rogers || Shuey (1) || 30,707 || 42–22
|- bgcolor="ffbbbb"
| 65 || June 14 || @ Yankees || 3–4 || Gooden || Ogea (3–1) || Wetteland || 32,580 || 42–23
|- bgcolor="ccffcc"
| 66 || June 15 || @ Yankees || 10–3 || Nagy (11–1) || Boehringer || — || 42,032 || 43–23
|- bgcolor="ffbbbb"
| 67 || June 16 || @ Yankees || 4–5 || Pettitte || Martinez (8–4) || Wetteland || 51,180 || 43–24
|- bgcolor="ccffcc"
| 68 || June 18 || Red Sox || 9–7 || Swindell (1–0) || Sele || Mesa (23) || 42,209 || 44–24
|- bgcolor="ccffcc"
| 69 || June 19 || Red Sox || 11–4 || Hershiser (7–4) || Gordon || — || 42,276 || 45–24
|- bgcolor="ccffcc"
| 70 || June 20 || Red Sox || 5–4 || Shuey (1–1) || Stanton || — || 42,306 || 46–24
|- bgcolor="ffbbbb"
| 71 || June 21 || Yankees || 7–8 (10) || Nelson || Mesa (0–2) || Wetteland || 42,176 || 46–25
|- bgcolor="ffbbbb"
| 72 || June 21 || Yankees || 3–9 || Mendoza || Tavarez (2–4) || — || 42,454 || 46–26
|- bgcolor="ffbbbb"
| 73 || June 22 || Yankees || 9–11 || Brewer || Martinez (8–5) || Wetteland || 42,461 || 46–27
|- bgcolor="ffbbbb"
| 74 || June 23 || Yankees || 5–6 || Gooden || McDowell (6–6) || Wetteland || 41,767 || 46–28
|- bgcolor="ccffcc"
| 75 || June 25 || @ Red Sox || 4–0 || Hershiser (8–4) || Gordon || — || 33,576 || 47–28
|- bgcolor="ffbbbb"
| 76 || June 26 || @ Red Sox || 4–6 (15) || Garces || Embree (1–1) || — || 33,727 || 47–29
|- bgcolor="ffbbbb"
| 77 || June 27 || @ White Sox || 10–15 || Fernandez || Swindell (1–1) || — || 27,782 || 47–30
|- bgcolor="ffbbbb"
| 78 || June 28 || @ White Sox || 2–4 || Baldwin || Tavarez (2–5) || Hernandez || 33,136 || 47–31
|- bgcolor="ccffcc"
| 79 || June 29 || @ White Sox || 3–2 (10) || Shuey (2–1) || Karchner || — || 43,601 || 48–31
|- bgcolor="ccffcc"
| 80 || June 30 || @ White Sox || 4–2 || Hershiser (9–4) || Tapani || Mesa (24) || 30,351 || 49–31
|-

|- bgcolor="ffbbbb"
| 81 || July 1 || Royals || 2–4 || Haney || Nagy (11–2) || — || 40,814 || 49–32
|- bgcolor="ccffcc"
| 82 || July 2 || Royals || 3–2 || Poole (4–0) || Belcher || — || 42,283 || 50–32
|- bgcolor="ccffcc"
| 83 || July 3 || Royals || 6–4 || Tavarez (3–5) || Magnante || Shuey (2) || 42,470 || 51–32
|- bgcolor="ffbbbb"
| 84 || July 4 || White Sox || 5–6 (10) || Karchner || Mesa (0–3) || Hernandez || 42,355 || 51–33
|- bgcolor="ffbbbb"
| 85 || July 5 || White Sox || 0–7 || Alvarez || Hershiser (9–5) || — || 42,536 || 51–34
|- bgcolor="ffbbbb"
| 86 || July 6 || White Sox || 2–3 || Karchner || Shuey (2–2) || Hernandez || 42,454 || 51–35
|- bgcolor="ccffcc"
| 87 || July 7 || White Sox || 6–1 || Ogea (4–1) || Fernandez || Assenmacher (1) || 42,343 || 52–35
|- bgcolor="ccffcc"
| 88 || July 11 || @ Twins || 11–7 || McDowell (7–6) || Radke || — || 16,438 || 53–35
|- bgcolor="ccffcc"
| 89 || July 12 || @ Twins || 7–5 || Mesa (1–3) || Stevens || Shuey (3) || 18,246 || 54–35
|- bgcolor="ccffcc"
| 90 || July 13 || @ Twins || 19–11 || Ogea (5–1) || Aguilera || — || 31,552 || 55–35
|- bgcolor="ffbbbb"
| 91 || July 14 || @ Twins || 4–5 || Guardado || Plunk (2–1) || — || 25,312 || 55–36
|- bgcolor="ffbbbb"
| 92 || July 15 || @ Royals || 3–6 || Magnante || Tavarez (3–6) || Montgomery || 22,294 || 55–37
|- bgcolor="ccffcc"
| 93 || July 16 || @ Royals || 10–4 || McDowell (8–6) || Haney || — || 16,871 || 56–37
|- bgcolor="ffbbbb"
| 94 || July 17 || @ Royals || 2–3 || Belcher || Hershiser (9–6) || Montgomery || 19,532 || 56–38
|- bgcolor="ccffcc"
| 95 || July 18 || Twins || 5–4 || Graves (1–0) || Guardado || — || 40,934 || 57–38
|- bgcolor="ffbbbb"
| 96 || July 19 || Twins || 2–3 || Rodriguez || Nagy (11–3) || Naulty || 42,373 || 57–39
|- bgcolor="ccffcc"
| 97 || July 20 || Twins || 6–5 (11) || Shuey (3–2) || Stevens || — || 43,433 || 58–39
|- bgcolor="ccffcc"
| 98 || July 21 || Twins || 7–5 || McDowell (9–6) || Radke || Shuey (4) || 42,341 || 59–39
|- bgcolor="ccffcc"
| 99 || July 22 || @ Blue Jays || 4–2 || Hershiser (10–6) || Hanson || Mesa (25) || 35,517 || 60–39
|- bgcolor="ffbbbb"
| 100 || July 23 || @ Blue Jays || 1–3 || Hentgen || Ogea (5–2) || Timlin || 35,194 || 60–40
|- bgcolor="ccffcc"
| 101 || July 24 || @ Blue Jays || 10–0 || Martinez (9–5) || Janzen || — || 35,218 || 61–40
|- bgcolor="ccffcc"
| 102 || July 25 || @ Orioles || 10–7 || Nagy (12–3) || Coppinger || — || 47,025 || 62–40
|- bgcolor="ccffcc"
| 103 || July 26 || @ Orioles || 14–9 || Assenmacher (1–1) || Mussina || — || 46,751 || 63–40
|- bgcolor="ffbbbb"
| 104 || July 27 || @ Orioles || 2–14 || Wells || Hershiser (10–7) || — || 47,360 || 63–41
|- bgcolor="ccffcc"
| 105 || July 28 || @ Orioles || 6–3 (13) || Mesa (2–3) || Stephenson || — || 46,273 || 64–41
|- bgcolor="ffbbbb"
| 106 || July 30 || Blue Jays || 1–3 || Flener || Martinez (9–6) || Timlin || 42,355 || 64–42
|- bgcolor="ccffcc"
| 107 || July 31 || Blue Jays || 4–2 || Assenmacher (2–1) || Timlin || — || 42,301 || 65–42
|-

|- bgcolor="ffbbbb"
| 108 || August 1 || Blue Jays || 3–5 || Hanson || Lopez (1–3) || Timlin || 42,249 || 65–43
|- bgcolor="ccffcc"
| 109 || August 2 || Orioles || 11–1 || Hershiser (11–7) || Erickson || — || 42,465 || 66–43
|- bgcolor="ffbbbb"
| 110 || August 3 || Orioles || 4–9 || Orosco || Ogea (5–3) || — || 42,448 || 66–44
|- bgcolor="ccffcc"
| 111 || August 4 || Orioles || 14–2 || Anderson (1–1) || Coppinger || — || 42,349 || 67–44
|- bgcolor="ffbbbb"
| 112 || August 5 || Orioles || 10–13 || Wells || Assenmacher (2–2) || — || 40,863 || 67–45
|- bgcolor="ccffcc"
| 113 || August 6 || @ Mariners || 4–3 || Lopez (2–3) || Wells || Mesa (26) || 31,472 || 68–45
|- bgcolor="ccffcc"
| 114 || August 7 || @ Mariners || 5–4 || Tavarez (4–6) || Charlton || Mesa (27) || 30,431 || 69–45
|- bgcolor="ccffcc"
| 115 || August 8 || @ Mariners || 2–1 || Ogea (6–3) || Mulholland || Mesa (28) || 36,822 || 70–45
|- bgcolor="ccffcc"
| 116 || August 9 || @ Athletics || 10–4 || McDowell (10–6) || Telgheder || — || 20,122 || 71–45
|- bgcolor="ffbbbb"
| 117 || August 10 || @ Athletics || 1–5 || Adams || Nagy (12–4) || — || 30,238 || 71–46
|- bgcolor="ffbbbb"
| 118 || August 11 || @ Athletics || 3–9 || Wasdin || Lopez (2–4) || — || 21,914 || 71–47
|- bgcolor="ccffcc"
| 119 || August 12 || @ Angels || 5–4 || Hershiser (12–7) || Finley || Mesa (29) || 19,499 || 72–47
|- bgcolor="ffbbbb"
| 120 || August 13 || @ Angels || 2–4 || Boskie || Ogea (6–4) || Percival || 19,569 || 72–48
|- bgcolor="ffbbbb"
| 121 || August 14 || @ Angels || 7–8 || Gohr || McDowell (10–7) || Percival || 23,887 || 72–49
|- bgcolor="ccffcc"
| 122 || August 16 || Tigers || 3–1 (12) || Assenmacher (3–2) || Lewis || — || 42,485 || 73–49
|- bgcolor="ccffcc"
| 123 || August 17 || Tigers || 6–3 || Hershiser (13–7) || Thompson || Mesa (30) || 42,511 || 74–49
|- bgcolor="ccffcc"
| 124 || August 18 || Tigers || 11–3 || Ogea (7–4) || Williams || — || 42,337 || 75–49
|- bgcolor="ffbbbb"
| 125 || August 19 || Rangers || 3–10 || Pavlik || McDowell (10–8) || — || 42,393 || 75–50
|- bgcolor="ccffcc"
| 126 || August 20 || Rangers || 10–4 || Lopez (3–4) || Witt || — || 42,370 || 76–50
|- bgcolor="ffbbbb"
| 127 || August 21 || Rangers || 8–10 (10) || Vosberg || Tavarez (4–7) || — || 42,345 || 76–51
|- bgcolor="ffbbbb"
| 128 || August 23 || Brewers || 5–6 (11) || Jones || Mesa (2–4) || Fetters || 42,405 || 76–52
|- bgcolor="ffbbbb"
| 129 || August 24 || Brewers || 3–4 (10) || Wickman || Plunk (2–2) || Fetters || 42,437 || 76–53
|- bgcolor="ccffcc"
| 130 || August 25 || Brewers || 8–5 || Shuey (4–2) || Miranda || Mesa (31) || 42,335 || 77–53
|- bgcolor="ccffcc"
| 131 || August 26 || @ Tigers || 2–1 || Nagy (13–4) || Lira || — || 22,349 || 78–53
|- bgcolor="ccffcc"
| 132 || August 27 || @ Tigers || 12–2 || Lopez (4–4) || Thompson || — || 19,602 || 79–53
|- bgcolor="ccffcc"
| 133 || August 28 || @ Tigers || 9–3 || Hershiser (14–7) || Sager || — || 21,091 || 80–53
|- bgcolor="ffbbbb"
| 134 || August 30 || @ Rangers || 3–5 || Pavlik || Ogea (7–5) || Russell || 40,383 || 80–54
|- bgcolor="ffbbbb"
| 135 || August 31 || @ Rangers || 3–6 || Oliver || McDowell (10–9) || Vosberg || 46,319 || 80–55
|-

|- bgcolor="ccffcc"
| 136 || September 1 || @ Rangers || 8–2 || Nagy (14–4) || Burkett || — || 46,084 || 81–55
|- bgcolor="ffbbbb"
| 137 || September 2 || @ Brewers || 6–7 || Jones || Mesa (2–5) || — || 18,015 || 81–56
|- bgcolor="ffbbbb"
| 138 || September 3 || @ Brewers || 2–8 || Karl || Hershiser (14–8) || — || 10,599 || 81–57
|- bgcolor="ccffcc"
| 139 || September 4 || @ Brewers || 7–0 || Ogea (8–5) || D'Amico || — || 12,666 || 82–57
|- bgcolor="ccffcc"
| 140 || September 8 || Mariners || 2–1 || Nagy (15–4) || Mulholland || — || 42,307 || 83–57
|- bgcolor="ffbbbb"
| 141 || September 8 || Mariners || 5–6 || Charlton || Mesa (2–6) || — || 42,217 || 83–58
|- bgcolor="ccffcc"
| 142 || September 9 || Angels || 4–3 || Shuey (5–2) || Holtz || Mesa (32) || 42,208 || 84–58
|- bgcolor="ccffcc"
| 143 || September 10 || Angels || 7–5 || Assenmacher (4–2) || Percival || — || 42,181 || 85–58
|- bgcolor="ccffcc"
| 144 || September 11 || Angels || 2–0 || McDowell (11–9) || Finley || Mesa (33) || 42,264 || 86–58
|- bgcolor="ccffcc"
| 145 || September 12 || Angels || 11–2 || Anderson (2–1) || Boskie || — || 42,244 || 87–58
|- bgcolor="ccffcc"
| 146 || September 14 || Athletics || 9–2 || Nagy (16–4) || Wengert || — || — || 88–58
|- bgcolor="ccffcc"
| 147 || September 14 || Athletics || 9–8 || Plunk (3–2) || Small || Mesa (34) || 42,233 || 89–58
|- bgcolor="ffbbbb"
| 148 || September 15 || Athletics || 9–10 (10) || Reyes || Mesa (2–7) || — || 42,226 || 89–59
|- bgcolor="ccffcc"
| 149 || September 16 || @ White Sox || 4–3 || McDowell (12–9) || Alvarez || — || 25,392 || 90–59
|- bgcolor="ccffcc"
| 150 || September 17 || @ White Sox || 9–4 || Anderson (3–1) || Fernandez || Plunk (2) || 18,763 || 91–59
|- bgcolor="ccffcc"
| 151 || September 18 || @ White Sox || 4–3 || Lopez (5–4) || Baldwin || Mesa (35) || 20,289 || 92–59
|- bgcolor="ccffcc"
| 152 || September 19 || Royals || 9–1 || Ogea (9–5) || Appier || — || 42,297 || 93–59
|- bgcolor="ffbbbb"
| 153 || September 20 || Royals || 4–6 || Bevil || Nagy (16–5) || Bluma || 42,358 || 93–60
|- bgcolor="ccffcc"
| 154 || September 21 || Royals || 13–4 || Hershiser (15–8) || Rosado || — || 42,339 || 94–60
|- bgcolor="ccffcc"
| 155 || September 22 || Royals || 6–5 || McDowell (13–9) || Jacome || Mesa (36) || 42,291 || 95–60
|- bgcolor="ccffcc"
| 156 || September 23 || Twins || 7–6 || Graves (2–0) || Parra || Mesa (37) || 42,299 || 96–60
|- bgcolor="ccffcc"
| 157 || September 24 || Twins || 7–5 || Ogea (10–5) || Rodriguez || Mesa (38) || 42,272 || 97–60
|- bgcolor="ccffcc"
| 158 || September 25 || Twins || 6–3 || Nagy (17–5) || Robertson || — || 42,469 || 98–60
|- bgcolor="ffbbbb"
| 159 || September 27 || @ Royals || 6–11 || Rosado || Hershiser (15–9) || — || 15,939 || 98–61
|- bgcolor="ccffcc"
| 160 || September 28 || @ Royals || 5–4 || Mercker (1–0) || Scanlan || Mesa (39) || 19,820 || 99–61
|- bgcolor="ffbbbb"
| 161 || September 29 || @ Royals || 1–4 || Belcher || Ogea (10–6) || Pichardo || 14,556 || 99–62
|-

|-
| Legend:       = Win       = LossBold = Indians team member

Detailed records

Notable transactions
May 14, 1996: Greg Cadaret was signed as a free agent with the Cleveland Indians.
June 15, 1996: Greg Swindell signed as a free agent with the Cleveland Indians.

Roster

Player stats

Batting

Starters by position 
Note: Pos = Position; G = Games played; AB = At bats; H = Hits; Avg. = Batting average; HR = Home runs; RBI = Runs batted in

Other batters 
Note: G = Games played; AB = At bats; H = Hits; Avg. = Batting average; HR = Home runs; RBI = Runs batted in

Pitching

Starting pitchers 
Note: G = Games pitched; IP = Innings pitched; W = Wins; L = Losses; ERA = Earned run average; SO = Strikeouts

Other pitchers 
Note: G = Games pitched; IP = Innings pitched; W = Wins; L = Losses; ERA = Earned run average; SO = Strikeouts

Relief pitchers 
Note: G = Games pitched; W = Wins; L = Losses; SV = Saves; ERA = Earned run average; SO = Strikeouts

Award winners
Omar VIzquel, Hutch Award
All-Star Game

Postseason

ALDS: Cleveland Indians vs. Baltimore Orioles
Baltimore wins the series, 3-1

Minor league affiliates

References

1996 Cleveland Indians at Baseball Reference
1996 Cleveland Indians at Baseball Almanac
1996 WS at Baseball Reference

Cleveland Guardians seasons
Cleveland Indians season
American League Central champion seasons
Cleve